Gongnong Subdistrict is a subdistrict in Xiashan District, Zhanjiang, Guangdong province, China. , it has 4 residential communities and 2 villages under its administration.

See also 
 List of township-level divisions of Guangdong

References 

Township-level divisions of Guangdong
Zhanjiang